Alanna Masterson (born June 27, 1988) is an American actress, known for her role as Tara Chambler in the AMC television series The Walking Dead.

Early life
Masterson was born in New York City, to Carol Masterson and Joe Reaiche, a Lebanese-Australian former professional rugby league footballer with the Sydney Roosters and the South Sydney Rabbitohs. She is the younger sister to her brother, Jordan Masterson, and two half-brothers, Danny Masterson and Christopher Masterson. After some time on Long Island, the family later relocated to Los Angeles. She grew up around and was influenced by her older brothers who both starred in popular television shows in the late 1990s and early 2000s. Masterson's passion for acting came from spending a lot of time on set with her brothers and seeing the filming process.

Career
Masterson has portrayed Tara Chambler on the AMC TV series The Walking Dead, beginning in the show's fourth season. Masterson was promoted to a series regular for the fifth season and was added to the main credits in the seventh season. Additionally, she had a recurring role in the fourth season of the ABC series Mistresses.

Personal life
On November 4, 2015, Masterson and then-boyfriend Brick Stowell had a daughter, Marlowe.

Masterson and her brother are Scientologists and are estranged from her father, due to Scientology's practice of shunning critics.

Filmography

References

External links
 
 

Living people
1988 births
20th-century American actresses
21st-century American actresses
Actresses from New York (state)
American child actresses
American people of Australian descent
American people of Lebanese descent
American television actresses
American Scientologists
Masterson family
People from Long Island